Zbigniew Niziński (2 April 1900 – 1 May 1975) was a Polish footballer. He played in one match for the Poland national football team in 1922.

References

External links
 

1900 births
1975 deaths
Polish footballers
Poland international footballers
Place of birth missing
Association footballers not categorized by position